Despite its name, the Alaska Rabbit originates in Germany, rather than Alaska. It is a medium-sized rabbit breed, weighing around 3–4 kg (7-9 lb) with glossy black fur, any colour other than black is a fault for this breed.

It is recognised by the British Rabbit Council; however it is not recognised by the American Rabbit Breeders Association.

The Alaska rabbit was created in 1900 by Max Fischer, of Gotha, and Schmidt, of Langensalza. They crossed Havanas, Dutch, Himalayans and Champagne d'Argents with the goal of obtaining a rabbit that looks like the Alaskan fox, which would be profitable in the fur trades of that time. They did not achieve this goal, and instead ended up with the black Alaska that is known today. These black Alaskans were first shown in 1907, and imported to North America in the 1970s by Bert Reurs of Canada. They were added into the American Rabbit Breeders Standard, but removed in 1981 after little interest in the breed developed.

The Alaska rabbit weighs 7-9 lbs. It is considered a Normal Fur breed by British Rabbit Council standards, and only comes in its standard, pitch black color. The Alaska Rabbit Club is the BRC's national specialty club for this breed.

See also

List of rabbit breeds

References

Rabbit breeds originating in Germany